The following are the national records in athletics in Qatar maintained by Qatar Athletics Federation (QAF).

Outdoor

Key to tables:

A = affected by altitude

X = unratified due to doping violation

NWI = no wind information

Men

Women

Indoor

Men

Women

Notes

References
General
World Athletics Statistic Handbook 2019: National Outdoor Records
World Athletics Statistic Handbook 2018: National Indoor Records
Specific

External links
 QAF web site

Qatar
Records
Athletics
Athletics